Gerjeni Sport Klub is a professional football club based in Gerjen, Hungary, that competes in the Nemzeti Bajnokság III, the third tier of Hungarian football.

Honours

Domestic

Season results
As of 15 August 2021

External links
 Profile on Magyar Futball

References

Football clubs in Hungary
Association football clubs established in 1951
1951 establishments in Hungary